Jenya Wilson Lano (Moscow, 1978) is a Russian-Italian actress and comedian, best known for her recurring role as Inspector Sheridan in ten episodes of the American television series Charmed.

Career
Raised in Moscow, Russia, and in Rome, Italy, Lano is fluent in English, Russian and Italian.

Lano made her debut in the 1998 film Shrieker. She also made appearances in Blade, S.W.A.T., Ghost Rock, Stealing Candy and Fashionably L.A., as well guest starring in the TV series The Shield, Xena: Warrior Princess and NCIS. In 2004 she voiced the character of Xenia Onatopp in the video game GoldenEye: Rogue Agent.

Filmography

Film

Television

References

External links
 

1978 births
Living people
Actresses from Moscow
Soviet emigrants to Italy
Italian actresses